The Northwest administrative region of the Missouri Department of Conservation encompasses Andrew, Atchison, Buchanan, Caldwell, Carroll, Chariton, Clinton, Daviess, DeKalb, Gentry, Grundy, Harrison, Holt, Linn, Livingston, and Mercer counties.  The regional conservation office is in St. Joseph.

Notes 

 Acreage and counties from MDCLand GIS file
 Names, descriptions, and locations from Conservation Atlas Online GIS file

Lotts Creek Conservation Area was sold to private individuals in 2018.  It is not open to the public.

References 

 
 

Northwest region